Petar Vukićević (born August 7, 1956) is a Serbian former hurdler who competed for Yugoslavia in the 1980 Summer Olympics  in 110m hurdles finishing 8th in semi final heat.

His children Christina and Vladimir compete for Norway.

References
 Sports reference

1956 births
Living people
Athletes from Belgrade
Serbian male hurdlers
Yugoslav male hurdlers
Olympic athletes of Yugoslavia
Athletes (track and field) at the 1980 Summer Olympics
Serbian emigrants to Norway